Karin Borner (born 21 September 1935) is a Swiss former competitive figure skater. She represented Switzerland at the 1956 Winter Olympics in Cortina d'Ampezzo. She won the bronze medal at the 1956 Richmond Trophy.

Competitive highlights

References 

1935 births
Figure skaters at the 1956 Winter Olympics
Swiss female single skaters
Living people
Olympic figure skaters of Switzerland
Place of birth missing (living people)